The Social-Political Group was a political faction in Switzerland.

History
The faction was originally known as the Democratic Group, and consisted of a coalition of parties from different cantons, including the Extreme Left party from Ticino and the Democratic Group from Graubünden.

In the 1919 federal elections the faction won four seats. Although it was reduced to three seats in the 1922 elections, it won five seats in the 1925 elections. However, it was reduced back to three seats after the 1928 elections. In 1931 the faction was renamed the Social-Political Group, and won only two seats in the elections that year. In 1935 it won three seats, and in "silent elections" of 1939, it won five. It retained all five seats in the 1943 and 1947 elections, but was reduced to four seats in the 1951 elections. The faction retained its four seat strength in elections in 1955, 1959 and 1963, before being reduced to three seats in the 1967 elections.

In 1971, before the elections that year, the faction split into two. The Glarus and Graubunden branches merged with the Party of Farmers, Traders and Independents to form the Swiss People's Party, while the rest of the group merged into the Free Democratic Party.

References

Defunct political parties in Switzerland
Political parties established in 1860
Political parties disestablished in 1971
1971 disestablishments in Switzerland
1860 establishments in Switzerland
Radical parties
Liberal parties in Switzerland